{{Infobox prepared food
| name             = Patatas bravas
| image            = Patatas bravas madrid.jpg
| image_size       = 240px
| caption          = A plate of patatas bravas
| country          = Madrid
| region           = 
| creator          = 
| course           = Appetizer
| served           = 
| main_ingredient  = Potato
| variations       = 
| calories         = 
| other            = 
}}

Patatas bravas, also called patatas a la brava or papas bravas, all meaning "spicy potatoes", is a dish native to Spain. It typically consists of white potatoes that have been cut into -wide cubes, then fried in oil and served warm with a spicy sauce. This dish is commonly served in restaurants and bars in Madrid, and throughout Spain as part of tapas.

 Consumption  
Patatas bravas are served in bars in servings that contain approximately a quarter kilo of potato.  It is frequently consumed as part of tapas.

The same sauce is sometimes served over mussels. This dish is known as mejillones en salsa brava''.

See also 
 French fries
 Potato chip
 Papas arrugadas
 List of potato dishes
 Patatas a lo pobre

References

Spanish cuisine
Potato dishes
Deep fried foods
National dishes
Tapas